Pernille Larsen Feldmann (born 1 February 2000) is a Norwegian professional racing cyclist, who currently rides for UCI Women's Continental Team .

References

External links

2000 births
Living people
Norwegian female cyclists
Place of birth missing (living people)